The Bridge is a 1992 independent film based on the novel by Maggie Hemingway. Directed by Sydney Macartney, it stars Saskia Reeves, David O'Hara, Joss Ackland, Rosemary Harris, Anthony Higgins, and Geraldine James. It was released in 1992.

Synopsis 
In the hot summer of 1887, life seems idyllic when Isobel Hetherington and her three young daughters moved into their seaside residence. But when Philip Wilson Steer arrives for his annual painting visit, a chain of events set off to change their lives forever. Overcome by his first sight of Isobel, Steer immediately decides to capture her on canvas; and as the painting grows, so does their love for each other. But jealousy and tragedy eventually force them to confront reality.

Cast

Soundtrack 

The soundtrack of this film was released in 1992 by Demon Records.

 Opening Titles: "Painting" (2:03)
 Quay House (2:03)
 Arriving In Suffolk (2:17)
 The Storm (3:28)
 Reginald & Isobel Return to London (3:09)
 The Sitting (2:19)
 Walberswick Fete (4:27)
 Fireworks (1:45)
 France (4:38)
 The Kiss (1:44)
 Love Theme: 'I Only Have One Subject Now' (2:18)
 Reginald's Proposition (1:52)
 Mr. Todd's Release (1:27)
 What Did You See Emma? (1:29)
 The Garden (2:25)
 Leaving Without Saying Goodbye (1:20)
 We've Come To An Arrangement (0:55)
 The Bridge (03:42)
 End Titles: "Steer's Theme" (2:54)

Home media releases
The film was released on VHS in 1992, but it has never been released as a DVD. It is currently available through a number of video on demand subscription channels.

External links 
 The Bridge (1992 film) at the Internet Movie Database

Bridge, The
Bridge, The
Bridge, The
British romantic drama films
1992 independent films
1990s English-language films
1990s British films